Erebuni Airport  is a military airport serving Yerevan and the country of Armenia. At present, the airport is mostly operated by the military and is home to the Russian 3624th Air Base and hosts a squadron of MiG-29s and Mi-24 attack helicopters. Private firms do on occasion operate chartered helicopter flights inside the country and to the CIS. The airport is also home to a single Diamond DA40 aircraft used by the local flying school.

History
The base was designed by architects L. Sh. Khristaforyan and R. G. Asratyan and design engineers E. N. Tosunyan and I. G. Baghramyan.

In November 2013, the Armenian government announced its intention to expand the space allotted to the Russian Air Force to house new buildings, fuel-storage facilities, and helicopter landing pads to host a squadron of 18 attack helicopters. In January 2014, the press service of the Russian Southern Military District confirmed that a contingent of Mi-24P (Hind-F) attack helicopters, Mi-8MT and Mi-8SMV military transport helicopters would be deployed at Erebuni through the course of the year.

On 4 November 2008, an Mi-24 attack helicopter of the Armenian Air Force crashed as it was preparing for a training flight. Captain Arshak Nersisyan died in the accident.

See also

 List of airports in Armenia
 List of the busiest airports in Armenia
 Military of Armenia
 Transport in Armenia

References

External links 
Department of Civil Aviation of Armenia (official site)

Airports built in the Soviet Union
Airports in Armenia
Buildings and structures in Yerevan
Soviet Air Force bases
Transport in Yerevan
Armenian Air Force